Jean-François Gillet (born 31 May 1979) is a Belgian professional football coach and a former goalkeeper. He works as a goalkeeping coach at Standard Liège. At international level, he was a member of the Belgian squad that took part at UEFA Euro 2016.

Club career

Standard Liège and Monza
He began his professional career in the youth system of Standard Liège and was called up to the first team at the age of just 17. In 1996, he made his debut in Belgian First Division and the following season he took to the field on another two occasions.

In the summer of 1999, at the age of twenty, he moved outright to Monza, then in Serie B. As a starter, he disputed 33 games.

Bari and Treviso
After playing four games in August with Monza, in the final days of the transfer market he accepted a move to Bari in Serie A, who paid 5 million lire.

His first season in the top flight, despite 20 appearances and some stand-out performances in goal, was marred by a prosecution for doping. After the match Bari-Reggina on 21 January, in fact, he became the first player in Italy to be indicted for testing positive for Nandrolone and was forced by the sports court to serve a four-month disqualification.

Over the next ten years he played 317 games for Bari in Serie A and Serie B, with the exception of a short loan with Treviso in 2003–04, due to some disagreements with the then coach Marco Tardelli.

On 13 March 2008 he renewed his contract with the Galletti until 2011.

In 2007 Antonio Conte arrived at Bari, and Gillet adapted his role in the team and was employed as a sweeper keeper. The team triumphed in Serie B, returning to the top flight after a seven-year absence.

In 2009–10, his performances were confirmed again at the highest level, only conceding seven goals in the first 12 rounds; with the defensive pairing of Andrea Ranocchia and Leonardo Bonucci, they were among the teams in Europe with the fewest goals conceded.

On 18 March 2010 he renewed with Bari until 2014, and on 12 September 2010 against Napoli, he officially became Bari's most-capped player after reaching 319 appearances for the jersey of the pugliesi, overcoming Bari legend Giovanni Loseto. For this reason, the mayor of Bari gave the Belgian goalkeeper the keys of the city as a sign of attachment to the club and the city. Gillet remained a formidable goalkeeper: saving two penalties from Francesco Totti, during the two matches between Bari and Roma, and one from Robert Acquafresca of Cagliari. At the end of the season, however, Bari were once again relegated to Serie B.

Bologna

In 2011, after Bari's relegation to Serie B, Gillet expressed his desire to finish his career in Serie A and was transferred to Bologna in a deal worth €1.4 million.  At his farewell press conference, Gillet tearfully bid farewell to his adopted home in Bari and their fans.  In his first season at Bologna, Gillet immediately showed his goalkeeping abilities and was quickly taken to by the Bologna faithful. His 29 league appearances in goal helped Bologna finish 9th in the 2011–12 Serie A season, the club's best finish in a decade.

Torino
On 5 July 2012 Gillet transferred to Torino for €1.7 million, with whom he signed a contract for three years. At Torino he was reunited with former coach Giampiero Ventura from Bari, making his debut on 26 August against Siena in a scoreless draw. He played 37 matches for the Granata in the 2012–13 season. However, on 6 June 2013, in the aftermath of the Bari match-fixing scandal, he was indicted for sporting fraud and on 16 July was suspended for three years and seven months due to his role in the matches Bari-Treviso on 11 May 2008; and Salernitana-Bari on 23 May 2009.

On 24 January 2014 the TNAS reduced the disqualification to 13 months (five of which he had already served). Gillet returned on 17 August 2014 in a triangular friendly in Mondovì against Bra and Virtus Mondovi. On 22 August he was recalled by Ventura for the Europa League playoff round against RNK Split. On 18 September Gillet played his first game as a starter for Torino since his suspension against the Belgian team Club Brugge, which ended 0–0 thanks to his heroic parries.

Catania
On 30 January 2015, he transferred to Catania, on a contract until 2017.

Loan to Mechelen

On 4 October 2015, Gillet saved three penalties for Mechelen in a league game against Anderlecht.

Standard Liège
On 17 March 2018 he played as Standard Liège beat Genk 1–0 in extra time to win the 2018 Belgian Cup Final and qualify for the UEFA Europa League.

International career
In August 2009, at the age of 30, after a strong performance against Inter Milan for Bari, he was called up to the Belgian senior team in view of qualification for the 2010 World Cup against Spain and Armenia.

He debuted 5 September 2009 in Spain, parrying a David Villa penalty, before conceding 5 goals. He conceded 2 goals in the next game, which saw the Belgian team defeated in Armenia by 2 to 1. On 14 November, he kept a clean sheet in a friendly against Hungary and again against Qatar.

Style of play

Match fixing allegations
On 16 July 2013, Gillet received a forty-three-month ban from football following his role in suspected match fixing during his time at Bari. On appeal this ban was reduced to 13 months, with return scheduled for August 2014.

Career Statistics

International

Honours
Standard Liège
 Belgian Cup: 2017–18

References

External links
 
 
 

Belgian footballers
Belgium youth international footballers
Belgium under-21 international footballers
Belgium international footballers
S.S.C. Bari players
Bologna F.C. 1909 players
Treviso F.B.C. 1993 players
Torino F.C. players
1979 births
Belgian Pro League players
Serie A players
Serie B players
Living people
Belgian expatriate footballers
Expatriate footballers in Italy
Association football goalkeepers
A.C. Monza players
Standard Liège players
K.V. Mechelen players
Footballers from Liège
UEFA Euro 2016 players